The Black Desert (aṣ-Ṣaḥrāʾ as-sawdāʾ) is a region of volcano-shaped and widely spaced mounds, distributed along about  in western Egypt between the White Desert in the south and the Bahariya Oasis in the north. Most of its mounds are capped by basalt sills, giving them the characteristic black color.

Geology
The mounds of the Black Desert, up to 100 metres (328 feet) high, vary in size, composition, height, and shape as some are dark consisting of iron quartzite while others are more reddish as its surface rocks consist of iron sandstone. On the outskirts of the Black Desert are volcanic hills proving the eruption of dark volcanic dolerite, dating back to the Jurassic period 180 million years ago.

Palaeobiology 
Remains of shrubs, and fossilized woodlands have been found in the Black Desert indicating that plants once grew there.

Declaration of Natural Reserve 
After discovering a large dinosaur skeleton on its borders, the Black Desert has been declared a natural reserve as of 2010.

References

National parks of Egypt
Deserts of Egypt
Protected areas established in 2010